The 1980 State of the Union address was given by President Jimmy Carter, the 39th president of the United States, to a joint session of the 96th United States Congress on January 23, 1980. 
He addressed the Iran Hostage Crisis and the Soviet invasion of Afghanistan: "At this time in Iran, 50 Americans are still held captive, innocent victims of terrorism and anarchy. Also at this moment, massive Soviet troops are attempting to subjugate the fiercely independent and deeply religious people of Afghanistan."

The speech lasted 32 minutes and 4 seconds. and contained 3412 words.

The Republican Party response was delivered by Senator Ted Stevens (AK) and Representative John Rhodes (AZ).

See also
1980 United States presidential election

References

External links
 (full transcript), The American Presidency Project, UC Santa Barbara.
 1980 State of the Union Address (video) at C-SPAN
 1980 State of the Union Address (audio)

State of the Union addresses
Speeches by Jimmy Carter
Presidency of Jimmy Carter
96th United States Congress
Iran hostage crisis
State of the Union Address
State of the Union Address
State of the Union Address
January 1980 events in the United States